Ivuniraarjuq Island is one of several Canadian arctic islands in Nunavut, Canada within western Hudson Bay. The closest community is Whale Cove,  to the west.

References

Islands of Hudson Bay
Uninhabited islands of Kivalliq Region